The No Name Restaurant was a seafood restaurant open for more than 100 years on the Boston Fish Pier in the Seaport District.

History
No Name was opened by Nick Contos in 1917 as a stand to serve the fishermen workers on the pier but over time, turned into a full service restaurant. The Contos family never named the restaurant. Late in 2019, the restaurant filed for chapter 7 Bankruptcy.

References

Esternal links
 Video of No Name on Food Paradise (season 4)

Defunct restaurants in Boston
Seaport District
Defunct seafood restaurants in the United States
1917 establishments in Massachusetts
2019 disestablishments in Massachusetts
Seafood restaurants in Massachusetts